Anything's Possible is a 2022 American coming-of-age romantic comedy film directed by Billy Porter and written by Ximena García Lecuona.

The film was released on July 22, 2022, on Prime Video.

Plot
When Khal develops a crush on his high school classmate Kelsa, a confident girl who happens to be trans, he musters up the courage to ask her out and a romance ensues.

Cast
 Eva Reign as Kelsa
 Abubakr Ali as Khal
 Renée Elise Goldsberry as Selene
 Courtnee Carter as Em
 Kelly Lamor Wilson as Chris
 Grant Reynolds as Otis
 Caroline Travers as Molly 
 Lav Raman as Shivani
 Tordy Clark as Minty Fresh
 Noah Pacht as Chance

Production

Development
In November 2020, it was revealed that actor Billy Porter would be making his feature directorial debut with What If?, from a screenplay by Ximena García Lecuona, which appeared on the 2020 Black List and the 2019 GLAAD List. The film would mark the start of MGM's relaunch of Orion Pictures and deal with Killer Films. The premise has been compared to the likes of Love, Simon and Booksmart. Porter had been approached by the producers to direct. He agreed to sign on 30 pages into the script upon realizing the film would be set in his hometown of Pittsburgh.

It was produced by Christine Vachon and David Hinojosa of Killer Films and Andrew Lauren and D.J. Gugenheim of Andrew Lauren Productions. In April 2022, it was announced the film was re-titled Anything's Possible.

Casting
It was announced in April 2021 that Yasmin Finney would star as Kelsa. Porter stated he hoped to "populate" the cast with a lot of "true, authentic Pittsburgh people". In July 2021, Eva Reign, Abubakr Ali, Renée Elise Goldsberry, Courtnee Carter, Kelly Lamor Wilson and Grant Reynolds joined the cast of the film, with Reign replacing Finney due to being unable to secure a visa.

Filming
Principal photography began in July 2021, on location in Pittsburgh and the surrounding areas of Western Pennsylvania.

Release
Originally intended for a theatrical release, it was announced on May 17, 2022 that the film will be released on Amazon Prime Video. On June 1, 2022, it was dated for July 22, 2022. Porter cited the struggles and failures of low-budget and non-MCU franchise films at the box office since the start of the COVID-19 pandemic and the streaming success of the 2021 adaptation of Cinderella (also a Prime Video release which he starred in) as the reasons for the decision. He went on to say "Eyeballs will be on it because you can watch it from your house. Honey, you can watch it from your phone if you want to. And that’s the audience that it’s for." Amazon's March 17, 2022 acquisition of MGM also played a role in the film's move to a streaming release.

Reception

References

External links
 
 

2022 directorial debut films
2022 LGBT-related films
2022 romantic comedy films
2020s American films
2020s English-language films
African-American LGBT-related films
Amazon Prime Video original films
American coming-of-age comedy films
American high school films
American romantic comedy films
American teen LGBT-related films
Coming-of-age romance films
Films about interracial romance
Films about social media
Films about trans women
Films not released in theaters due to the COVID-19 pandemic
Films produced by Christine Vachon
Films set in Pittsburgh
Films shot in Pittsburgh
LGBT-related coming-of-age films
LGBT-related romantic comedy films
Killer Films films
Orion Pictures films
Transgender-related films